Lang Suan is a town (thesaban mueang) in southern Thailand. As of 2006 it had a population of 11,822 and includes the entire sub-district (tambon) Lang Suan and parts of Khan Ngoen, Pho Daeng, Laem Sai, and Wang Tako, all within Lang Suan District.

History
The township (thesaban tambon) Lang Suan was upgraded to town status on 20 February 2004.

References

External links

http://www.langsuancity.go.th

Populated places in Chumphon province